Daniel dos Santos (born 31 October 1978) is a Brazilian modern pentathlete. He competed in the men's individual event at the 2004 Summer Olympics.

References

External links
 

1978 births
Living people
Brazilian male modern pentathletes
Olympic modern pentathletes of Brazil
Modern pentathletes at the 2004 Summer Olympics
Place of birth missing (living people)
20th-century Brazilian people
21st-century Brazilian people